The  is a historic house located in Shibuya, Tokyo. The house includes a large garden reminiscent of roji, a kind of garden that surrounds a teahouse.

History 
The house was constructed in 1919 by Torajiro Asakura as his house, and a place for him to conduct business. It survived the Great Kantō earthquake and the Second World War. Fumihiko Maki, an architect working on a neighboring mall, insisted on the preservation of the house, citing it as a good example of Taisho era architecture.

References

External links 

 Shibuya City Office | Kyu Asakura House, an Important Cultural Property

Important Cultural Properties of Japan
Buildings and structures in Shibuya
Museums in Tokyo